Scoliacma ligneofusca is a moth in the family Erebidae. It was described by Walter Rothschild in 1912. It is found in Papua New Guinea. The habitat consists of coastal lowland areas.

References

Moths described in 1912
Lithosiina